
Year 238 (CCXXXVIII) was a common year starting on Monday (link will display the full calendar) of the Julian calendar. At the time, it was known as the Year of the Consulship of Pius and Pontianus (or, less frequently, year 991 Ab urbe condita). The denomination 238 for this year has been used since the early medieval period, when the Anno Domini calendar era became the prevalent method in Europe for naming years.

Events 
 By place 
 Roman Empire 
 Emperor Maximinus Thrax campaigns against the Carpians on the Danube in Moesia (Balkans). In spite of the payment of a tribute, the Romans fail to persuade the Goths and the Germanic tribes.
  March – Roman subjects in Africa revolt against Maximinus. The elderly Gordian yields to public demand that he succeed Maximinus and rules jointly with his 46-year-old son Gordian II.
  April – Battle of Carthage: Numidian forces loyal to Maximinus invade Africa with support of Legio III Augusta. Gordian II is killed  and after a siege, Gordian I commits suicide by hanging himself with his belt.
  May – The Senate outlaws Maximinus for his bloodthirsty proscriptions in Ancient Rome and nominates two of its members, Pupienus and Balbinus, to the throne.
 Maximinus advances to the town Aquileia in northern Italy; his army suffers from famine and disease, while the city is besieged. Soldiers of Legio II Parthica kill him in his tent, along with his son Maximinus (who is appointed co-emperor). Their corpses are decapitated and their heads carried to Rome.
  August – The Praetorian Guard storms the palace and captures Pupienus and Balbinus. They are dragged naked through the streets of Rome and executed. On the same day Gordian III, age 13, is proclaimed the new emperor. Timesitheus becomes his tutor and advisor.
 Future Emperor Valerian becomes princeps senatus.
 The Colosseum is restored after being damaged.
 The Goths, coming from Ukraine, cross the Danube and devastate the Roman Empire up to the border with Anatolia. 
 In North Africa, Legio III Augusta is dissolved.  Until its reconstitution in 253, Africa is defended by auxiliary forces only.

 China 
 Sima Yi, a Chinese general of the Cao Wei state, destroys the outlying northeastern warlord Gongsun Yuan in the Liaodong campaign.

 By topic 
 Commerce 
 The silver content of the Roman denarius falls to 28 percent under Emperor Gordian III, down from 35 percent under Alexander Severus.

Births 
 Wen Yang (or Ciqian), Chinese general (d. 291)
 Yang Yan (or Wuyuan), Chinese empress (d. 274)

Deaths 
 April 10 – Han Ji (or Gongzhi), Chinese politician
 April 12
Gordian I, Roman emperor (b.  159) 
Gordian II, Roman emperor (b. 192)
 July 29
 Balbinus, Roman emperor (b. 165)
 Pupienus, Roman emperor (b. 178)
 Bu Lianshi, Chinese noblewoman and concubine
 Gongsun Yuan (or Wenyi), Chinese warlord
 Maximinus Thrax, Roman emperor (b. 173)
 Maximinus the Younger, Roman emperor
 Zhu Huan (or Xiumu), Chinese general (b. 177)

References